Princess is a 2008 television film starring Kip Pardue and Nora Zehetner.

Cast
 Nora Zehetner as Princess Ithaca
 Kip Pardue as William Humphries
 Deborah Grover as Nana
 Matthew Edison as Louis Baxter
 Mayko Nguyen as Sophie Baxter
 Nicole Gale Anderson as Jitterbug/Princess Calliope
 Dominic Cuzzocrea as Manticore
 Brian Paul as Mr. Danforth
 Deborah Tennant as Mrs. Danforth
 Shileen Paton as Mermaid - Cala
 Rebecca Northan as Angular Woman
 Ashley Wright as Stout Husband
 Craig Burnatowski as Tattoo Guy
 Kerry Griffin as Man in Front
 Norma Clarke as Well Dressed Woman
 Libby Adams as Little Girl #1
 Azuriah Glaze-Dominique as Little Girl #2
 Aurora Kruk as Female Street Kid
 Jasmine Richards as Skater Girl
 Mallory Margel as 18-year-old Girl
 Devon Bostick as Older Boy
 Kasia Vassos as Fairy Mother
 Andrew Craig as Male Street Kid
 Ryan Gifford as Yeti
 Tanya Manjura as Pixie #1
 Siarhei Bushchyk as Pixie #2
 Mya Rylyn Banks as Fairy Baby

External links
 
 

ABC Family original films
2000s English-language films
2008 television films
2008 films
Films about mermaids
Films set in New York City
Films directed by Mark Rosman
2008 drama films